Foundation Capital is a venture capital firm located in Silicon Valley.  The firm was founded in 1995, and in 2012 managed more than $2.4 billion in investment capital.

History

Foundation Capital was founded in 1995.

The firm raised its seventh and at the time the largest fund of $750 million in April 2008.  It was one of Netflix's original investors.

In 2013 the firm closed its seventh fund with $282 million and its eighth fund in 2015 with $325 million.

Foundation Capital has invested in approximately 200+ ventures over the course of the last 19 years, 23 of which have had initial public offerings. It currently maintains investments in around 80 companies.  Most investments fall under the areas of consumer tech, fin-tech, mar-tech, energy, enterprise tech, and applications. Its partners have been members of the founding executive teams of Silicon Valley startups of the past two decades, with each having an average of 15 years of operating experience. 

In 2019 Foundation Capital closed its ninth fund with $350 million in commitments.

Foundation Capital was an investor in the bankrupt crypto company FTX.

Programs
The firm's Entrepreneur-in-Residence program selects several candidates to incubate, train, and graduate, challenging them to develop a solid business plan for an emerging technology.

The firm's Young Entrepreneurs Program builds relationships with American business schools to offer Foundation Capital access and exposure to promising entrepreneurs and startups through various MBA networks. Through the program, the Foundation offers graduate students an opportunity to gain experience identifying promising startups, pitching ventures, providing analysis of the opportunities, and building constructive relationships.

References

External links
Conversation on Entrepreneurship with Kathryn Gould, co-founder of Foundation Capital (Feb. 2015), Stanford Entrepreneurship Corner

Venture capital firms of the United States
Companies based in Menlo Park, California
Financial services companies established in 1995
1995 establishments in California